Pleomerium is a genus of fungi within the Meliolaceae family. This is a monotypic genus, containing the single species Pleomerium fuscoviridescens.

it was formerly Naetrocymbe fuscoviridescens (in the Naetrocymbe genus).

References

External links
Pleomerium at Index Fungorum

Meliolaceae
Monotypic Sordariomycetes genera